Petr Krištůfek (born 23 March 1971) is a Czech former professional footballer who played for České Budějovice, Bohemians Praha, Atlantic Lázně Bohdaneč and Chrudim.

References

1971 births
Living people
Czech footballers
SK Dynamo České Budějovice players
Bohemians 1905 players
AFK Atlantic Lázně Bohdaneč players
MFK Chrudim players
Czech First League players
Czech National Football League players
Association footballers not categorized by position